1 These countries are currently not participating in the EU's single market (EEA), but the EU has common external Customs Union agreements with Turkey (EU-Turkey Customs Union in force since 1995), Andorra (since 1991) and San Marino (since 2002). Monaco participates in the EU customs union through its relationship with France; its ports are administered by the French. Vatican City has a customs union in effect with Italy.
2 Monaco, San Marino and Vatican City are not members of Schengen, but act as such via their open borders with France and Italy, respectively.
3 Switzerland is not an official member of EEA but has bilateral agreements largely with same content, making it virtual member.

Euler diagram

Notes

statistics